Siyannu is a Syrian village in Jableh District in Latakia Governorate. According to the Syria Central Bureau of Statistics (CBS), Siyannu had a population of 4,784 in the 2004 census.

History
Siyannu, which was also known as Ušnatu, was part of Ugarit, before having its independence and becoming a border region with Amrit during the reign of the Hittite King Muršili II. Siyannu/Shianu, led by King Adunu Baal, took part in the Battle of Qarqar against the invading Assyrians.

Nahr as-Sinn was also called "Siyannu" which marked the southern borders of Ugarit.

References

Alawite communities in Syria
Populated places in Jableh District
Ugarit